William D. Mackowski (July 21, 1916 – November 22, 2002) was a Republican member of the Pennsylvania House of Representatives.

References

Republican Party members of the Pennsylvania House of Representatives
2002 deaths
1916 births
20th-century American politicians